Noel Patrick Turley (13 December 1936 – 12 May 2015) was an Ireland international rugby union player. 

Turley also played for Connacht through a parentage qualification and played only once for Ireland on 10 February 1962 in a 16–0 defeat to England in Twickenham.

Turley was a teacher in St_Michael's College Dublin   for many years

Notes

1936 births
Irish rugby union players
Ireland international rugby union players
Blackrock College RFC players
Rugby union players from County Laois
2015 deaths